Quch Kandi may refer to:
 Quch Kandi, Poldasht